The 9th Trampoline World Championships were held in Tulsa, Oklahoma, United States on July 3, 1976.

Results

Men

Trampoline

Trampoline Synchro

Double Mini Trampoline

Tumbling

Women

Trampoline

Trampoline Synchro

Double Mini Trampoline

Tumbling

References
 Trampoline UK

Trampoline World Championships
Trampoline Gymnastics World Championships
1976 in American sports
International gymnastics competitions hosted by the United States